is a passenger railway station located in the city of Akiruno, Tokyo, Japan, operated by East Japan Railway Company (JR East).

Lines 
Higashi-Akiru Station is served by the Itsukaichi Line, and is located 3.5 kilometers from the starting point of the line at Haijima Station.

Station layout 
The station consists of a single ground-level island platform serving two tracks, with a small station building. The station is staffed.

Platforms

History

The station opened on 21 April 1925. With the privatization of Japanese National Railways (JNR) on 1 April 1987, the station came under the control of JR East.

Passenger statistics
In fiscal 2019, the station was used by an average of 4,593 passengers daily (boarding passengers only).

The passenger figures for previous years are as shown below.

Surrounding area
 Akirudai High School

See also
 List of railway stations in Japan

References

External links 

  

Stations of East Japan Railway Company
Railway stations in Tokyo
Railway stations in Japan opened in 1925
Akiruno, Tokyo
Itsukaichi Line